Queens Drive Halt (Manx: Stadd Imman y Ven-Rein) is an intermediate stopping place on the northern section of the Manx Electric Railway on the Isle of Man.

Location
Due to the nature of the tramway's construction, the cars can stop and drop off almost anywhere and will do so within reason.  For this reason a great number of localised stopping places have built up since the line was completed, many at the intersection of road crossings like this one.  The crossings/halts usually take the name of the nearest farm, landmark or road as is the case here, but these unofficial halts never appear in timetable materials or have nameboards fitted to show their names.

Queens Pier
The stop here serves Queens Drive and other parts of Ramsey, and is the closest stop to the famous Queen's Pier, landmark of the town.  At this point the line becomes inter-urban, running parallel to the roadway, notably featuring traction poles mounted at the side of the line, rather than between the running lines as is standard elsewhere.

Route

Also
Manx Electric Railway Stations

References

Sources
 Manx Manx Electric Railway Stopping Places (2002) Manx Electric Railway Society
 Island Island Images: Manx Electric Railway Pages (2003) Jon Wornham
 Official Tourist Department Page (2009) Isle Of Man Heritage Railways

Railway stations in the Isle of Man
Manx Electric Railway
Railway stations opened in 1899